Maxwell Bay is a waterway in Qikiqtaaluk Region, Nunavut, Canada. It lies off the southern coast of Devon Island in the eastern high Arctic. Like Croker Bay to the east, it is an arm of Lancaster Sound and Barrow Strait.

Maxwell Bay was named by William Edward Parry in honor of Sir Murray Maxwell.

References

Bays of Qikiqtaaluk Region